Purinton House is a historic home associated with the West Virginia University and located at Morgantown, Monongalia County, West Virginia. It was built in 1904, and is a -story masonry dwelling with Classical Revival and Colonial Revival style features. It features a large wraparound porch whose hip roof is supported by Ionic order columns.  The porch roof is topped by a balustrade.  The roof is topped by a balustraded deck and widow's walk.  It served as the on-campus residence for university presidents from 1905 to 1967.  On November 2, 1911, President William Howard Taft delivered the address "World Wide Speech," from the front porch of Purinton House.

It was listed on the National Register of Historic Places in 1985.

References

West Virginia University campus
Houses on the National Register of Historic Places in West Virginia
Colonial Revival architecture in West Virginia
Neoclassical architecture in West Virginia
Houses completed in 1904
Houses in Morgantown, West Virginia
National Register of Historic Places in Monongalia County, West Virginia
1904 establishments in West Virginia